Bellator MMA (formerly Bellator Fighting Championships) is an American mixed martial arts promotion founded in 2008 and based in Santa Monica, California, owned and operated as a subsidiary of television and media conglomerate Paramount Global. It is the second largest in the United States and one of the largest combat sport promotions in the world. The promotion takes its name from bellātor, the Latin word for "warrior".

Bellator's first event was held in 2009, and the promotion had since held over 200 "numbered" events as of December 2019. The promotion features talents such as Vadim Nemkov, Kyoji Horiguchi, Yoel Romero, Yaroslav Amosov, Patrício Pitbull, Cris Cyborg, A. J. McKee, Michael Page, Douglas Lima, Usman Nurmagomedov, Gegard Mousasi, and Sergio Pettis. Fighters such as Eddie Alvarez, Michael Chandler, Ben Askren, Anthony Johnson, Rory MacDonald, and Fedor Emelianenko have also fought under the Bellator umbrella.

History 
Bellator was founded in 2008 by Chairman and CEO Bjorn Rebney. Under Rebney's ownership, Bellator events were structured around single-elimination tournaments. In December 2011, Viacom purchased majority ownership of Bellator. 

In May 2014, Bellator hosted the company's inaugural pay-per-view event from the Landers Center. 

In June 2014, it was announced that both Chairman/CEO Bjorn Rebney and President Tim Danaher were relieved of their positions. Rebney was succeeded by Strikeforce founder Scott Coker. Under Coker, Bellator would drop its season-long tournament format in early 2015, transitioning into more of a traditional, single-fight event schedule. Since 2018, Bellator hosts divisional grand-prix tournaments.

Broadcast partners 
Since the fourth season in 2011, Bellator cards have been predominantly broadcast on Viacom-owned networks in the United States. Beginning in January 2013, Bellator telecasts were moved from MTV2 to Spike (later relaunched as Paramount Network in 2018) following the end of the latter channel's partnership with the UFC. In September 2013, Bellator signed a multi-year partnership agreement with Fox Sports Latin America.

On June 26, 2018, Bellator announced a five-year streaming deal with DAZN, covering the U.S. and other markets served by the sports-oriented streaming service. Since Bellator 206, this includes all events aired by Paramount Network, as well as seven exclusive cards per-year. In March 2020, Bellator announced a deal with ESPN Brasil to broadcast events in the country.

Following Viacom's re-merger with CBS Corporation in 2019, CBS Sports Network debuted the recap series, Bellator MMA: Recharged, on April 25, 2020. 

Due to problems stemming from COVID-19 pandemic, the contract with DAZN was consensually and prematurely discontinued in 2020. On September 11, 2020, it was announced that Bellator cards would move to CBS Sports Network starting October 1, with preliminary bouts to stream on YouTube and CBSSports.com.

Five months later, on February 9, 2021, it was announced that Bellator events would air exclusively on Showtime beginning with Bellator 255 on April 2, 2021. The following day, it was announced that the BBC would also broadcast Bellator events on BBC iPlayer in the United Kingdom.

Rankings

In February 2021, Scott Coker announced that the organization will incorporate official rankings beginning from Bellator 255 in April.

Roster

Current champions

Events

Fight Master 

On February 5, 2013, Bellator and Spike announced the launch of a new reality competition series titled Fight Master: Bellator MMA.  The coaches and trainers for the series, which will feature 32 welterweight fighters, will be Randy Couture, Frank Shamrock, Greg Jackson, and Joe Warren. The 32 fighters competed for a spot in Bellator's fall welterweight tournament, culminating in a live season finale. The series premiered on Spike on June 19, 2013, and ran for a single season.

Bellator Kickboxing 

In 2016, Bellator Kickboxing, a sibling kickboxing promotion was founded. Its inaugural event, Bellator Kickboxing 1, was held on April 16, 2016.

Tournament History

Season One 
Bellator Fighting Championships: Season One (April 3, 2009 – June 19, 2009)

During Bellator's first season, events were broadcast nationally on ESPN Deportes in the United States. Bellator 1 took place on April 3, 2009, and like many events that season, aired via tape delay. Tournaments took place in the middleweight, welterweight, lightweight and featherweight divisions with the winners becoming the inaugural Bellator World Champions in their specific weight class. Héctor Lombard defeated Jared Hess in the finals of the middleweight tournament to become the 185 lb. Champion while Lyman Good defeated Omar De La Cruz to secure the Bellator Welterweight Title. In addition, Eddie Alvarez defeated Toby Imada to win the Bellator Lightweight Belt while Joe Soto defeated Yahir Reyes to become the Bellator Featherweight Champion. Color commentary for Bellator's first season was provided by Jon Anik and Jason Chambers.

Winners:

Season Two 
Bellator Fighting Championships: Season Two (April 8, 2010 – June 24, 2010)

For Bellator's second season, events aired nationally on FOX Sports Net in the United States. Season two debuted on April 8, 2010, and like season one, hosted tournaments in the middleweight, welterweight, lightweight and featherweight divisions. Alexander Shlemenko defeated Bryan Baker (fighter) to become the Middleweight Tournament Champion while Ben Askren defeated Dan Hornbuckle to win the 170 lb tournament. Also, Pat Curran defeated Toby Imada to win the lightweight tournament and Joe Warren (fighter) defeated Patricio Pitbull to become the Featherweight Tournament Champion. Season two tournament champions were awarded a check for $100,000 and a title shot against the Season 1 Champions.  In addition to the tournament fights, season two was the first season to host non-tournament, non-title super fights for current champions. Three of Bellator's four champions competed in super fights during Season 2. Middleweight Champion Hector Lombard scored the fastest knockout in Bellator history when he defeated Jay Silva in a catch weight bout at Bellator 18. Also, Lightweight Champion Eddie Alvarez submitted Josh Neer in a catch weight bout at Bellator 17 and Joe Soto scored a technical knockout victory over Diego Saraiva in a featherweight bout at Bellator 19. Welterweight Champion Lyman Good was the only champion to not participate in a season two non-title super fight. Bellator also introduced the new commentary team of Jimmy Smith and Sean Wheelock during Season 2.

Winners:

Season Three 
Bellator Fighting Championships: Season Three (August 12, 2010 – October 28, 2010)

Bellator kicked off its third season on August 12, 2010, with tournaments in the bantamweight, heavyweight, and women's divisions. Zach Makovsky defeated Ed West at Bellator 32 to win the 135 lb tournament and become the promotions first ever Bellator Bantamweight Champion. Also that same evening, Cole Konrad submitted Neil Grove to win the heavyweight tournament and become the first Heavyweight Champion in Bellator history. Zoila Gurgel became the first Bellator Women's Champion when she defeated Megumi Fujii at Bellator 34. The first official title defense took place between defending Bellator Featherweight Champion Joe Soto and Season 2 Tournament Champion Joe Warren at Bellator 27. Warren defeated Soto by TKO to become the new Bellator Featherweight Champion. Other championship fights featured during season 3 were Hector Lombard retaining his Bellator middleweight championship by defeating Season 2 Tournament Winner, Alexander Shlemenko and Season 2 Welterweight Tournament Champion, Ben Askren, defeating reigning champion Lyman Good to become the new Bellator Welterweight Champion. Some of the memorable moments from Bellator's Season three are Eddie Alvarez's third-round TKO victory over UFC veteran Roger Huerta in a non-title match and Bellator Middleweight Champion Hector Lombard's 38 second knockout of Herbert Goodman at Bellator 24.

Winners:

Season Four – The MTV2 Partnership 
Bellator Fighting Championships: Season Four (March 5, 2011 – May 21, 2011)

Season Four of Bellator began broadcasting nationally on March 5, 2011, and marked the promotions departure from FOX Sports Net to MTV2.  Season 4 showcased tournaments in the featherweight, lightweight, welterweight and light heavyweight divisions. Patricio "Pitbull" defeated Daniel Mason-Straus at Bellator 45 to become the Bellator Featherweight Tournament Champion while Christian M'Pumbu defeated Richard Hale (fighter) the same night to become the first Bellator Light Heavyweight Champion in history. Also, Michael Chandler became the Bellator Season 4 Lightweight Tournament Champion when he defeated Patricky "Pitbull" at Bellator 44 while Jay Hieron booked a welterweight title shot by defeating Rick Hawn in the Bellator Welterweight Tournament Championship at Bellator 43. Some of the memorable highlights from Bellator's fourth season include Ben Saunders earning a TKO victory over Matt Lee in his Bellator debut, Richard Hale's inverted triangle choke over Nik Fekete at Bellator 38, a flying knee knockout by Patricky "Pitbull" over Toby Imada at Bellator 39 and Hector Lombard's one punch knockout of Falaniko Vitale at Bellator 44. Hale and Pitbull were, respectively, nominated for the 2011 World MMA Awards submission of the year and knockout of the year.

Winners:

Summer Series 2011 
Bellator Fighting Championships: 2011 Summer Series (June 25, 2011 – August 27, 2011)

In the summer of 2011, Bellator introduced the Summer Series which would feature a featherweight tournament that would decide a challenger for reigning Bellator Featherweight Champion Joe Warren. Like Season 4, the Summer Series was broadcast nationally on MTV2. A total of three events were held during the Summer Series including Bellator 47 which took place at Casino Rama in Rama, Ontario, Canada. This event marked the first time Bellator held an event outside the United States. In the featherweight tournament, Pat Curran defeated Marlon Sandro with a highlight reel head kick knockout in the finals at Bellator 48 to become the Bellator Summer Series Featherweight Tournament Champion. In addition to the featherweight tournament, Bellator also hosted a number of featured bouts, including Cole Konrad's non-title win over Paul Buentello and Seth Petruzelli securing a knockout win over former UFC Heavyweight Champion Ricco Rodriguez at Bellator 48.

Winner:

Season Five: The Viacom Era 
Bellator Fighting Championships: Season Five (September 10, 2011 – November 26, 2011)

Bellator's fifth season, which began on September 10, 2011, continued to air on MTV2 in the United States as well as in HD on Epix. Bellator Tournaments for Season Five featured the bantamweight, welterweight, middleweight and heavyweight divisions. Additionally, Bellator announced that the preliminary cards for each event would air on Spike.com as well as Bellator's Facebook page. In the tournament finals, Eduardo Dantas defeated Alexis Vila at Bellator 59 to become the Bellator Bantamweight Tournament Champion while Douglas Lima knocked out Ben Saunders at Bellator 57 to become the Bellator Welterweight Tournament Champion. Also, Alexander Shlemenko defeated Vitor Vianna at Bellator 57 to become the Bellator Middleweight Tournament Champion while the heavyweight final between Eric Prindle and Thiago Santos was ruled a no contest after an accidental groin kick left Prindle unable to continue. Santos failed to make weight for a scheduled rematch causing the bout to be cancelled, and Prindle to be awarded the tournament win by default. On October 26, 2011, Viacom, the parent company of MTV Networks, announced the purchase of a majority stake in Bellator. As part of the deal, Paramount Network, then known as Spike TV, began broadcasting Bellator live in 2013. On November 7, 2011, in an effort to expand to outside markets, Bellator announced a five-year partnership with FremantleMedia that would allow the company to position itself as one of the premier MMA organizations internationally. On November 19, 2011, at Bellator 58, the company hosted what was called the best fight in the promotion's early history. Bellator Lightweight Champion Eddie Alvarez fought Season 4 Lightweight Tournament Champion Michael Chandler in a back-and-forth affair. In the end, Chandler defeated Alvarez via fourth round submission to become the new Bellator Lightweight Champion in a fight that several journalists called the fight of the year. Other memorable highlights from season five include Douglas Lima's knockout victory over Chris Lozano at Bellator 53, Eric Prindle's knockout win over Ron Sparks at Bellator 56, Vitor Vianna's knockout of Bryan Baker at Bellator 54 and a pair of knockout victories by Alexis Vila and Eduardo Dantas at Bellator 51.

Winners:

Season Six 
Bellator Fighting Championships: Season Six (March 9, 2012 – August 24, 2012)

Bellator's sixth season began on March 9, 2012, with Bellator 60, when Pat Curran captured the Bellator Featherweight Championship after beating champion Joe Warren. At Bellator 64, Ben Askren defended his Welterweight title against Douglas Lima by unanimous decision. At Bellator 65, Eduardo Dantas defeated then champion Zach Makovsky to become the new Bellator Bantamweight Champion. At Bellator 70, Cole Konrad took down Eric Prindle in the first round to defend his Bellator Heavyweight Championship.

Winners:

Summer Series 2012 
Bellator Fighting Championships: 2012 Summer Series (June 22, 2012 – August 24, 2012)

In the summer of 2012, Bellator held its second Summer Series which would feature a Light Heavyweight tournament that would decide a challenger for reigning Bellator Light Heavyweight Champion Christian M'Pumbu. The Summer Series started June 22, 2012, and was broadcast nationally on MTV2 for a total of three events. In the Light Heavyweight tournament, Attila Vegh defeated Travis Wiuff with a knockout in the finals at Bellator 73 to become the 2012 Bellator Summer Series Light Heavyweight Tournament Champion. In addition to the Light Heavyweight tournament, Bellator also hosted a number of featured bouts, including a third fight between Marius Zaromskis and Waachiim Spiritwolf at Bellator 72. Bellator also finished two Season Six tournaments with Karl Amoussou defeating Bryan Baker at Bellator 72 to become the Season Six Welterweight Champion, and Marcos Galvao defeating Luis Nogueira at Bellator 73 to become the Season Six Bantamweight Champion. Pat Curran was also set to defend his Featherweight Championship versus Patricio Friere, who is the Season Four Champion, at Bellator 73 but he was forced to withdraw from the bout due to an injury that occurred during training.

Winner:

Season Seven 
Bellator Fighting Championships: Season Seven (September 28, 2012 – December 14, 2012)

Bellator's seventh season began on September 28, 2012, with Bellator 74. The season showcased a heavyweight, welterweight, lightweight and featherweight tournament.

Winners:

Season Eight 
Bellator Fighting Championships: Season Eight (January 17, 2013 – April 4, 2013)

Bellator's eighth season began on January 17, 2013, at the Bren Events Center in Irvine, Calif. The event served as Bellator's premier on Spike TV. Season Eight included featherweight, lightweight, welterweight, middleweight and light heavyweight tournaments.

Winners:

Summer Series 2013 
Bellator MMA: 2013 Summer Series (June 19, 2013 – July 31, 2013)

Bellator's 2013 Summer Series began on June 19, 2013. All three of this season's tournaments were contested as four-man tournaments, as opposed to Bellator's standard eight-man tournament. The change in tournament size was necessary in order to hold multiple tournaments during the summer series' shortened season.

Winners:

Season Nine 
Bellator MMA: Season Nine (September 7, 2013 – November 22, 2013)

Bellator's Ninth season began on September 7, 2013. For this season the bantamweight and heavyweight tournaments were held as four-man tournaments, while all tournaments were the standard Bellator eight-man tournament.

Winners:

Season Ten 
Bellator MMA: Season Ten (February 28, 2014 – May 17, 2014)

Bellator's Tenth season began on February 28, 2014. For this season the middleweight and light heavyweight tournaments were held as four-man tournaments, while all tournaments were the standard Bellator eight-man tournament.

Summer Series 2014 
Bellator MMA: 2014 Summer Series (June 6, 2014 – July 25, 2014)

Bellator's 2014 Summer Series began on June 6, 2014. The 2014 Summer Series featured an eight-man light heavyweight tournament and a series of Season 10 tournament finals.

Season Eleven 
Bellator MMA: Season Eleven (September 5, 2014 – November 15, 2014)

This was Bellator's final tournament season, as well as the last to be overseen by former CEO & Chairman Bjorn Rebney.

See also 
 Bellator Kickboxing
 List of Bellator MMA events
 List of Bellator MMA champions
 List of current Bellator fighters
 List of Bellator MMA alumni

References

External links 
 

 
Mixed martial arts organizations
Mixed martial arts television shows
Sports organizations established in 2008
2008 establishments in California
Companies based in Santa Monica, California
Paramount Global subsidiaries
2011 mergers and acquisitions